Graham Seers (born 2 September 1958) is an Australian former road cyclist and cycling administrator. He competed in the individual road race event at the 1980 Summer Olympics.

Seers twice set the fastest time in the amateur Goulburn to Sydney Classic in 1982 and 1984 run from Goulburn to Liverpool.

References

External links
 

1958 births
Living people
Australian male cyclists
Olympic cyclists of Australia
Cyclists at the 1980 Summer Olympics
Place of birth missing (living people)